The American Society of Cataract and Refractive Surgery (ASCRS), a professional society for surgeons specializing in eye surgery, based in Fairfax, VA, was founded in 1974. It is distinct from its sister organization, the American Society of Ophthalmic Administrators (ASOA), which concerns itself with the business management, including insurance reimbursement and marketing, of ophthalmic practices in the United States. Both associations hold annual meetings or conventions as well as publishing proceedings.

ASCRS publishes a monthly Journal of Cataract & Refractive Surgery (JCRS), as a joint production with the European Society of Cataract and Refractive Surgeons (ESCRS).

Awards
Since 1975, the ASCRS annually awards the Binkhorst medal to doctors who have made significant contributions to the science and practice of ophthalmology, which includes a stipend to give the Binkhorst lecture.

Ophthalmology Hall of Fame 
Since 1999, the ASCRS has hosted the Ophthalmology Hall of Fame to which it periodically elects pioneers of ophthalmology as well as those who have significantly inspired, supported and led the development of ophthalmology.

1999
 José I. Barraquer (1916–1998) 
 Ramón Castroviejo (1904–1987) 
 Stewart Duke-Elder (1899–1978) 
 J. Donald M. Gass (1928–2005) 
 Charles D. Kelman (1930–2004) 
 A. Edward Maumenee (1913–1998) 
 Marshall M. Parks (1918–2005) 
 Harold Ridley (1907–2001) 
 Charles L. Schepens (1912–2006)
 Lorenz E. Zimmerman (1920–2013)

2000
 Ernst Fuchs (1851–1930) 
 Hans Goldmann (1899–1991) 
 Albrecht von Graefe (1828–1870) 
 Robert Machemer (1933–2009) 
 Frank B. Walsh (1895–1978)

2001
 Cornelius D. Binkhorst (1912–1995) 
 David G. Cogan (1908–1993) 
 Svyatoslav N. Fyodorov (1927–2000) 
 Hermann von Helmholtz (1821–1894) 
 Gerd Meyer-Schwickerath (1920–1992)

2002
 Bernard Becker (1920–2013)
 Jules Gonin (1870–1935)
 Edward W. D. Norton (1922–1994)
 Arnall Patz (1920–2010)

2003
 Danièle S. Aron-Rosa (born 1934)
 Joaquin Barraquer (1927–2016)
 Paul A. Chandler (1897–1987)
 William F. Hoyt (born 1926)
 Norman S. Jaffe (born 1924)
 Jules C. Stein (1896–1981)

2004
 Claes H. Dohlman (born 1922)
 Jonas S. Friedenwald, (1897–1955) 
 Govindappa Venkataswamy (1918–2006)

2005
 Jules François (1907–1984) 
 Gholam A. Peyman  
 Robert M. Sinskey

2006
 Algernon B. Reese (1896–1981)

2007
 Ida Caroline Mann (1893–1983)

2009
 Endre Alexander Balazs
 Jacques Daviel

2010
 Alan C. Bird
 Judah Folkman

2017
 Gullapalli Nageswara Rao

See also
 American Academy of Optometry

Notes and references

External links

Optometry
Eye care in the United States
Medical and health organizations based in Virginia